Petar Stanić (born 14 August 2001) is a Serbian football attacking midfielder who plays for Spartak Subotica, on loan from Red Star Belgrade.

Club career

Red Star Belgrade
Stanić signed a four-years contract with Red Star on 3 July 2021. He made a debut for the club on 29 August 2021 coming in as a substitute in a 1–2 away win against Čukarički.

Career statistics

Club

Honours

Club
Red Star Belgrade
 Serbian SuperLiga: 2021–22
 Serbian Cup: 2021–22

References

External links
 

2001 births
Living people
Association football midfielders
Serbian footballers
FK Železničar Pančevo players
Serbian First League players
Sportspeople from Pančevo
Red Star Belgrade footballers
Serbian SuperLiga players
Serbia under-21 international footballers